is the tenth studio album by Japanese singer/songwriter Mari Hamada, released on September 20, 1990. It was Hamada's final release by Invitation. The album was reissued alongside Hamada's past releases on January 15, 2014.

Hamada's 1993 international release Introducing... Mari Hamada features a rewritten version of "Is This Justice?" as "If It's Love". The 1994 international follow-up All My Heart includes an English version of "Heaven Knows".

Colors peaked at No. 2 on Oricon's albums chart. It was also certified Gold by the RIAJ.

Track listing

Personnel 
 Michael Landau – guitar
 Tim Pierce – guitar
 John Pierce – bass
 Jeff Daniel – keyboards
 Tom Keane – keyboards
 Charles Judge – keyboards
 John Keane – drums 
 Danny Fongheiser – drums
 Gerald Albright – saxophone
 David Woodford – saxophone
 Nick Lane – trombone
 Steve Madaio – trumpet

Charts

Certification

References

External links 
  (Mari Hamada)
  (Victor Entertainment)
 
 

1990 albums
Japanese-language albums
Mari Hamada albums
Victor Entertainment albums